Herman Leon Heath (October 27, 1928 – March 23, 2007) was an American football fullback in the National Football League for the Washington Redskins.  He played college football at the University of Oklahoma and was drafted in the first round (fourth overall) of the 1951 NFL Draft.

References

External links
 

1928 births
2007 deaths
American football fullbacks
Oklahoma Sooners football players
Washington Redskins players
All-American college football players
People from Hollis, Oklahoma
Players of American football from Oklahoma